The 1960 United States presidential election in Oregon took place on November 8, 1960, as part of the 1960 United States presidential election. Voters chose six representatives, or electors, to the Electoral College, who voted for president and vice president.

Oregon was won by incumbent Vice President Richard Nixon (R–California), running with United States Ambassador to the United Nations Henry Cabot Lodge, Jr., with 52.56% of the popular vote, against Senator John F. Kennedy (D–Massachusetts), running with Senator Lyndon B. Johnson, with 47.32% of the popular vote. , this is the last election in which Multnomah County voted for a Republican presidential candidate.

Primaries
Candidates had no choice as to whether or not they would run in the Oregon primaries. Oregon had a unique law in which all individuals believed to be candidates (by the Attorney General) would be listed, whether or not they wanted to compete in the state's primary.

Democratic primary

Since at least 1957, Kennedy had been anticipating running in Oregon's primary due to the state's unique election laws, which would give him no choice as to whether or not he would be listed on the ballot.

Oregon's primary came late, just prior to California's. Kennedy had made several appearances in Oregon in the spring of 1959, and was leading according to his campaign's internal polling against a plethora of prospective opponents. He garnered the support of figures such as Edith Green. By late 1959, however, Senator Wayne Morse launched a favorite son campaign, which posed a viable challenge to Kennedy's prospects of winning Oregon.

Hubert Humphrey had been seen as having a realistic chance of winning the strongly liberal state electorate if he were to remain a viable candidate through late-May (when the primary was scheduled). However, Humphrey ultimately withdrew earlier on after losing the West Virginia primary.

Kennedy's campaign worried about a potential active campaign effort by Adlai Stevenson II in the state, where many voters were still enamored with the two-time Democratic standard bearer. In a January 26, 1960 memo, campaign manager Robert Kennedy stated that it was important for the Kennedy campaign to try and stop Stevenson from becoming an active factor in the Oregon primary. Congressman Charles O. Porter was seen as being likely to lead any potential effort to support a Stevenson candidacy in Oregon, therefore, Robert considered persuading him that such an effort would hand the primary to Morse, whom Porter despised. However, by May this proved to be unneeded, as Kennedy had already cleared the field.

While names of several other contenders appeared on the Oregon Democratic primary ballot, the only active opponent which Kennedy faced in the primary was Morse. Oregon was the only state in which Kennedy directly challenged a favorite son candidate. The Kennedy campaign saw the fiercely independent and progressive state electorate as challenging for them to maneuver. He defeated Morse 51 to 32%.

Republican primary

General election

Results

Results by county

See also
 United States presidential elections in Oregon

References

Oregon
1960
1960 Oregon elections